Matrice may refer to:

Places
 Matrice, Campobasso, Molise, Abruzzi e Molise, Italy; a commune
 La Matrice, Linguaglossa, Catania, Sicily, Italy; a church
 Piazza Matrice, the public square containing the church San Cristofero, Chiesa Madre, Valguarnera Caropepe, Enna, Sicily, Italy
 Matrice, Hispania, Roman Empire; the Roman settlement that eventually became Madrid, Spain; see List of national capital city name etymologies

Products
 DJI Matrice, a recon drone
 Matrice, a 1989 album by Gérard Manset

Other uses
 Mother church (aka "matrice"), in Christianity
 matrice, a 19th century word for womb

 Matrice (horse), an Australian thoroughbred of the 1970s; see Leading sire in Australia
 Matrice (horse), an Australian racehorse of the 1950s, winner of the Linlithgow Stakes

See also

 
 
 Matrix (disambiguation)